Ruth Nortje (born 17 January 1967) is a South African-born, American sprint canoer who competed from the mid-1990s to the early 2000s (decade). She won three medals for the United States at the 2003 Pan American Games in Santo Domingo.

Nortje also competed for South Africa in two Summer Olympics, earning her best finish of seventh in the K-1 500 m event at Sydney in 2000.

References
Sports-Reference.com profile

1967 births
American female canoeists
Canoeists at the 1996 Summer Olympics
Canoeists at the 2000 Summer Olympics
Living people
Olympic canoeists of South Africa
South African female canoeists
Pan American Games gold medalists for the United States
Pan American Games silver medalists for the United States
Pan American Games medalists in canoeing
Canoeists at the 2003 Pan American Games
Medalists at the 2003 Pan American Games
21st-century American women